The 1978 English cricket season was the 79th in which the County Championship had been an official competition. There were growing concerns about the impact of World Series Cricket (WSC). On the domestic front, Kent won the County Championship despite Alan Knott and Derek Underwood having joined WSC. England defeated New Zealand 3–0 and Pakistan 2–0.

Honours
County Championship - Kent
Gillette Cup - Sussex
Sunday League - Hampshire
Benson & Hedges Cup - Kent
Minor Counties Championship - Devon
Second XI Championship - Sussex II 
Wisden - David Gower, John Lever, Chris Old, Clive Radley, John Shepherd

Test series

New Zealand tour

Pakistan tour

County Championship

Gillette Cup

Benson & Hedges Cup

Sunday League

Leading batsmen

Leading bowlers

References

External links
 CricketArchive – season and tournament itineraries

Annual reviews
 Playfair Cricket Annual 1979
 Wisden Cricketers' Almanack 1979

English cricket seasons in the 20th century
English Cricket Season, 1978
Cricket season